The Voith Gravita locomotives are a family of road switcher diesel-hydraulic locomotives built by Voith Turbo Lokomotivtechnik GmbH & Co. KG. Available in a range of configurations from 4 to 6 axles, they are designed for shunting and light and medium freight operations.

The 10BB version has been chosen by Deutsche Bahn as a replacement for its DB Class 290 locomotives with an order of 130 locos in 2008.

History

Voith, a well known manufacture of hydraulic transmissions and other locomotive components entered the locomotive building business in 2006 with the launch of the Voith Maxima locomotives at InnoTrans. The Gravita series was launched at the 2008 InnoTrans event. For the production of these locomotives a new plant has been constructed in Kiel, a city already known for locomotive production.

The Gravita 15BB variant was presented at InnoTrans 2010. The Gravita BB locomotives are currently used in Germany, Norway and Sweden.

Technology
Key features of this series are large fuel tanks, modular construction (allowing interchangeability of some parts between different classes), multi-traction (consisting) with other Voith locomotives, manual or remote operation, and a centrally located air conditioned drivers cabin.

The locomotives meet requirements for noise (TSI) and exhaust gas emission UIC II/EU IIIA (see International Union of Railways and European emission standards)

Variants

Voith offers 5 variants of this locomotive, ranging from a light shunter to a medium power locomotive. Some technical specifications are presented above (in the 'infobox'), the purpose of use is given below.
20BB Designed for regional and cross border traffic
15BB Designed for heavy shunting as well as mainline use
10BB Shunting and freight - minimalist design for heavy industrial operation
5C Heavy shunting and light freight
5B Light shunter

Servicing

Under an agreement with Häfen und Güterverkehr Köln (HGK) a workshop for servicing Voith locomotives has been established at Brühl-Vochem near Köln.

Career and orders

On 23 September 2008 it was announced that Deutsche Bahn had placed a €250 million order for 130 of the 10BB variant to be operated by its DB Schenker subsidiary.
The 1000 kW locos will have engines supplied by MTU, and are intended to replace the well known DB Class V 90 (aka DBAG Class 290); the new reporting number for this class of locomotive was 260. vehicles fitted with a diesel particulate filter received the class number 261.

10BB and 15BB type locomotives were initially offered via lease from Ox-Traction; the company ceased trading in August 2010.

Swiss companies Stahl Gerlafingen and Panlog AG took delivery of their Gravita 10BB locomotives in March 2010. Stahl Gerlafingen operates 2 locos, Panlog AG 3 locos.

The first 3 built locomotives were sold to leasing company Northrail and painted in orange livery in mid-2010. Voith has 5 additional leasing/stock locomotives which are being tested by different rail operators.

Baneservice Scandinavia currently operates a fleet of five Gravita 15BB locomotives based at the Port of Gothenburg in Gothenburg, Sweden, where they are designated as "Class 261". These locomotives primarily perform shunting duties at the Port of Gothenburg and have also more recently been used for some limited regular freight traffic, such as the Gothenburg–Limmared freight route.

References

External links 

Voith locomotives
260
Diesel-hydraulic locomotives of Germany
Diesel locomotives of Sweden
Locomotives of Sweden
Freight locomotives